Giancarlo Volpe is an Italian-born American animator, director, producer and comic creator.

Volpe directed, wrote, and storyboarded for the Disney Channel animated series Star vs. the Forces of Evil from 2015 to 2017.

On February 14, 2015, Volpe launched his webcomic God of Love via his giancarlovolpe.tumblr.com. The comic is 100% creator owned and features two elven lovers on the run when the goddess of love is replaced by an evil demon.

Graduating from the School of Visual Arts in 1997, Volpe began his career at Humongous Entertainment, animating on the children's computer games Pajama Sam 2: Thunder and Lightning Aren't so Frightening and Putt-Putt Enters the Race. In 1998, he began working at Film Roman to work on the Fox series King of the Hill, where he was a character layout artist and assistant director.

In 2005, Volpe went on to direct 19 episodes of the Nickelodeon series Avatar: The Last Airbender. He won an Annie award for the second season episode "The Drill".

In 2008, Volpe moved to Lucasfilm Animation as an episodic director on Star Wars: The Clone Wars where he worked directly with famed filmmaker George Lucas.

Volpe also produced the CG television show Green Lantern: The Animated Series, working with animation producer Bruce Timm. The series ran for 26 episodes and had a devout following, where its loyal fan base was dubbed “Fanterns”.

In January 2014, Warner Bros. Animation released JLA Adventures: Trapped in Time, which was produced and directed by Volpe. JLAATIT is a 52-minute direct-to-video movie featuring the Justice League and received critical praise for its fun factor and kid friendly tone.

Volpe also spent 2014 working at Riot Games, where he helped create animated content based on wildly popular MOBA game League of Legends. The content was designed to expand upon the very fast world and character base of the game.

Volpe also helped to develop and direct the pilot for Mike Tyson Mysteries.

Filmography

References

External links
 MobyGames profile
 deviantART Profile
 Tumblr blog

American animators
American comics artists
American animated film directors
American television directors
Living people
Year of birth missing (living people)